The Estonian Athlete of the Year is an annual award presented by the Estonian Olympic Committee (Eesti Olümpiakomitee, EOK) to one male and one female sportsperson judged to have delivered the best performance over the course of the year. The winners of the award, which was first conceived in the 1930s and has been presented every year since 1955, are chosen by an aggregated vote from sporting journalists, national sporting federations, and the public at large.

Initially an accolade presented to one individual, the award was split into male and female categories beginning in 1967. In 2020 the two categories were merged due to the disruption caused by the COVID-19 pandemic to the international and national sporting calendars. The athlete with the most wins is cyclist Erika Salumäe, who has won the award on nine occasions.

List of award winners

Cyclist Erika Salumäe has won Athlete of the Year more than any other athlete, male or female, with nine wins between 1983 and 1996. Skier Kristina Šmigun-Vähi is the second-most decorated winner, having been chosen as Female Athlete of the Year on eight occasions. Of male athletes, the most successful are weightlifter Jaan Talts, cyclist Aavo Pikkuus, and skier Andrus Veerpalu, each with five wins. Pikkuus holds the record for the most consecutive awards won, achieving his five successively between 1974 and 1978.

The youngest ever Athlete of the Year recipient is swimmer Kaire Indrikson who won in 1977 at the age of sixteen, while Aavo Pikkuus is the youngest male winner on record, achieving the first of his five wins in 1974 at the age of twenty. With a combined age of 39 years at the time of the 1977 awards, Indrikson and Pikkuus additionally constitute the youngest pair of winners from a single year. Chess player Paul Keres is the oldest person to be recognised as Athlete of the Year, winning his third award in 1962 at the age of 46. The oldest woman to win is fencer Heidi Rohi, who in 2001 was awarded Athlete of the Year at the age of 35. Keres also holds the record for the longest span of time over his awards, his third in 1962 coming 26 years after his first award in 1937. In awards presented solely after the Second World War, this distinction is held among male athletes by rower Jüri Jaanson, who won the award three times over fifteen years (1990–2004), and among female athletes by Erika Salumäe and Kristina Šmigun-Vähi, who each won their awards over fourteen-year periods (1983–1996 and 1997–2010 respectively).

Three members of the same family have each won Athlete of the Year: Ulvi Voog-Indrikson in 1957, her daughter Kaire Indrikson in 1977, and her granddaughter Triin Aljand in 2011 and 2012.

By year

Single award (1955–1966; 2020)

Split award (1967–2019; 2021– )

By number of wins 
The tables below list the individuals who have won Athlete of the Year more than once.

See also
 Estonian Young Athlete of the Year
 Estonian Coach of the Year
 Estonian Sports Team of the Year

Notes

References

General

Specific

External links
Official website 

Estonian sports trophies and awards
National sportsperson-of-the-year trophies and awards
Awards established in 1955
1955 establishments in Estonia
Lists of Estonian sportspeople